Richard Mallié (born 26 October 1948) is a French politician who has served as Mayor of Bouc-Bel-Air since 2014, previously holding the office from 1989 to 2002. He was a member of the National Assembly from 2002 to 2012, where he represented the 10th constituency of Bouches-du-Rhône, as a member of the Union for a Popular Movement (UMP). In 2015, Mallié joined its successor party The Republicans (LR).

From 2001 to 2008, Mallié also held a seat in the General Council of Bouches-du-Rhône for the canton of Gardanne. In 2015, he returned to the newly-renamed Departmental Council of Bouches-du-Rhône for the canton of Vitrolles.

References

1946 births
Living people
Politicians from Besançon
Politicians from Provence-Alpes-Côte d'Azur
20th-century French politicians
21st-century French politicians
Republican Party (France) politicians
Liberal Democracy (France) politicians
Union for a Popular Movement politicians
The Popular Right
The Republicans (France) politicians
Mayors of places in Provence-Alpes-Côte d'Azur
Departmental councillors (France)
Deputies of the 12th National Assembly of the French Fifth Republic
Deputies of the 13th National Assembly of the French Fifth Republic